Nina Consuelo Epton (1913 – 29 October 2010) was a British radio producer, broadcaster and travel writer, particularly active in the 1950s and 1960s. She travelled alone through Spain, North Africa, and Indonesia. In the 1970s she published a number of historical works about royalty, two books about cats, and a novel based on the life of Jane Digby.

Her greatest commercial success was a series of literary, historical and sociological books about amorous relationships: Love and the French (1959), Love and the English (1960), Love and the Spanish (1961). In various combinations these were translated into French, German and Spanish. All three were reprinted by Penguin Books in 1964–1965.

Life

Early life
Epton was born in Hampstead to a Scottish father and a Spanish mother. She was educated partly in England and partly in France, graduated from the University of Paris, and travelled widely.

Career
During the 1950s she was the producer of the BBC's French-Canadian department, with particular responsibility for BBC contributions to the Canadian Broadcasting Corporation's French-language newsreel, Revue de l'actualité. Between 1953 and 1969 she was also an occasional contributor to the BBC Home Service and the BBC Light Programme as a presenter, interviewer, and panellist.

As a travel writer she was considered something of a novelty in the early 1950s as a good-looking woman who travelled alone and engaged deeply and critically with local conditions.

Epton died on 29 October 2010.

Publications

Articles
"A Visit to Xavier, the Birthplace of St Fracis", in The Tablet, 23 Oct. 1954.
"What about Santa Claus? A Child's Christmas in Spain", in The Tablet, 17 Dec. 1955.
"Medieval Echoes in Modern Texas", in The Tablet, 21 Dec. 1968.

Books
Journey under the Crescent Moon (London: V. Gollancz, 1949).
Oasis Kingdom: The Libyan Story (London: Jarrolds, 1952).
Islands of the Sunbird: Travels in Indonesia (London and New York: Jarrolds, 1954).
The Islands of Indonesia, 4 volumes (London: Pitman, 1955)
The Valley of Pyrene (London: Cassell, 1955).
Grapes and Granite (London: Cassell, 1956)
The Palace and the Jungle (London: Oldbourne Press, 1957)
Navarre: The Flea between Two Monkeys (London: Cassell, 1957)
The Golden Sword: Being the dramatized story of Sir Thomas Stamford Raffles, 1781–1826 (London: Oldbourne, 1957)
Saints and Sorcerers: A Moroccan Journey (London: Cassell, 1958).
Love and the French (London: Cassell, 1959)
Love and the English (London: Cassell, 1960)
Love and the Spanish (London, 1961)
Milord and Milady (London: Oldbourne, 1962)
Seaweed for Breakfast: A Picture of Japanese Life Today (London: Cassell, 1963)
Madrid (London: Cassell, 1964)
Spain's Magic Coast, from the Miño to the Bidassoa: A personal guidebook (London: Weidenfeld & Nicolson, 1966)
Stewart Wavell, Audrey Butt, Nina Epton, Trances (London: Allen & Unwin, 1966)
Spanish Fiestas: including romerías, excluding bull-fights (London: Cassell, 1968)
Andalusia (London: Weidenfeld & Nicolson, 1968)
Victoria and Her Daughters (London: Weidenfeld and Nicolson, 1971).
The Spanish Mousetrap: Napoleon and the Court of Spain (London: Macdonald and Co, 1973)
Cat Manners and Mysteries (London: Michael Joseph, 1973)
The Burning Heart: A novel based on the life of Jane Digby, Lady Ellenborough (London: Macdonald and Jane's, 1974)
Magic and Mystics of Java (London: Octagon Press, 1974)
Josephine: The Empress and Her Children (London: Weidenfeld and Nicolson, 1975)
Dora Bell's Village Cats (London: Joseph, 1977)

References

External links
Photograph of Nina Epton behind the microphone
Visits to Tripoli of Dr A Marchese and of Miss Nina Epton. Code JT file 1632 (Foreign Office file, 1950)
A First-Hand Account of Nationalist Movements in North Africa (Records of Royal Institute of International Affairs, 1948)

1913 births
2010 deaths
University of Paris alumni
BBC radio presenters
BBC radio producers
British travel writers
British women travel writers
People from Peacehaven
British expatriates in France
Women radio producers